Mércio José Santos da Silva or simply Mércio (born 26 May 1980) is a Brazilian football player who plays for Famalicão.

References

External links
 

1980 births
Sportspeople from Recife
Living people
Brazilian footballers
Association football midfielders
Brazilian expatriate footballers
Rio Ave F.C. players
Expatriate footballers in Portugal
C.D. Aves players
C.D. Trofense players
Olympiakos Nicosia players
AEK Larnaca FC players
F.C. Famalicão players
Primeira Liga players
Liga Portugal 2 players
Cypriot First Division players
Brazilian expatriate sportspeople in Cyprus
Expatriate footballers in Cyprus